Henry Wynkoop (March 2, 1737March 25, 1816) was an American politician, who was member of the Continental Congress (from 1779) and later a United States representative for the state of Pennsylvania during the First United States Congress, 1789 to 1791.

Life and career
Wynkoop was born in Northampton Township in the Province of Pennsylvania on March 2, 1737. He inherited his father's 153 acre farm in Newtown upon his death in 1759.  He was admitted to Princeton University but he did not complete his studies as he got involved in local politics.

Prior to his term as a representative, he served as a justice of the Court of Common Pleas  and the orphan's court in Kingston, Pennsylvania from 1780 to 1789. After his term in Congress, he was appointed as an Associate Judge in Bucks County, as which he served until his death in that county on March 25, 1816; he was interred in the graveyard of the Low Dutch Reformed Church, Richboro, Pennsylvania.

Wynkoop owned slaves.

Family
Wynkoop married three times and had eight  children.  In 1761 he married Susannah Wanshaer, who died in 1776. In 1777 he married Maria Cummings, who died in 1781. He married his third wife, Sarah Newkirk, who died in 1813.

References

Further reading
Beatty, Joseph M., Jr. "The Letters of Judge Henry Wynkoop, Representative From Pennsylvania to the First Congress of the United States." Pennsylvania Magazine of History and Biography 38 (January 1914): 39–64, 183–205.

Geyer, Virginia B., FURTHER NOTES ON HENRY WYNKOOP
Mrs. Geyer was the author of the 1976 history for the Bucks County Historical Journal (Fall 1976 Edition) celebrating Northampton Township's 250th anniversary. The article, which deals with Henry Wynkoop the man, supplements a paper on Wynkoop the politician, read at the Historical Society meeting in May by Lyle L. Rosenberger, Associate Professor of History at the Bucks County Community College. It is on file at the BCHS Library.  Link: https://freepages.rootsweb.com/~wynkoop/genealogy/webdocs/further.htm

External links

 

1737 births
1816 deaths
American people of Dutch descent
Continental Congressmen from Pennsylvania
18th-century American politicians
Members of the United States House of Representatives from Pennsylvania
People from Bucks County, Pennsylvania
Place of birth missing
18th-century American judges
19th-century American judges
Judges of the Pennsylvania Courts of Common Pleas